Francesca Bria is the President of the Italian National Innovation Fund. She is an Italian innovation economist and  information technologist who lectures at various universities and is a consultant to the United Nations and the European Commission.

Bria is Honorary Professor in the Institute  for Innovation and Public Purpose at UCL in London. She is part of the Management Board of the Italian public broadcast company RAI, and a member of the EC President Ursula von der Leyen's High level Roundtable for The New European Bauhaus. She is a senior adviser and Ambassador to the United Nation (UN-Habitat) on digital cities and digital rights. She is the former Chief Digital Technology and Innovation Officer for the City of Barcelona and founder of the Decode Project, an EU-wide effort to reclaim citizen's data sovereignty . She is an Honorary Professor on Technology and Innovation Policy at University College London (UCL), where she teaches about the platform economy, digital sovereignty and people-centered smart cities.

Biography 
Francesca Bria was raised in the Monti district of Rome. She is the daughter of a renowned and influential psychoanalyst, and an Olympic gymnast. Bria is today the President of the Italian National Innovation Fund and a Board Member of the Italian public media company RAI. She is Honorary Professor in the Institute for Innovation and Public Purpose at UCL in London and she is part of the High-level Roundtable for the New European Bauhaus set up by the EC President Ursula von der Leyen. She is the former Chief Digital Technology and Innovation Officer for the City of Barcelona in Spain. In this role, she was leading the smart city Agenda and she was one of the founders of the Cities Coalition for Digital Rights, a UN-backed platform to promote sustainable digitization and urban digital transformation that work for the benefit of all. She has served as Senior Adviser to the United Nation (UN-Habitat) on digital cities and digital rights, launching the People-focused smart cities programme at the World Urban Forum convened in Abu Dhabi that promotes the deployment of technological innovations to realize sustainability, inclusivity, and human rights. Francesca Bria is leading the DECODE project on data sovereignty in Europe, is a member of the European Commission high level expert group Economic and Societal Impact of Research and Innovation (ESIR), and a Senior Adviser on the EC programme STARTS (Innovation at the nexus of Science, Technology and the Arts). 

She graduated with a BSc in social sciences for international cooperation from Sapienza university. She then moved to London and gained an MSc in E-business and Innovation from the University College of London and a PhD in Innovation economics and management from Imperial College in London. Bria joined Nesta, a UK based innovation agency, where she was to remain for 8 years, and was promoted to senior project lead. While still at Nesta, Bria also lectured at various universities, along with consulting and facilitating various projects in the UK and Europe, with clients ranging from grassroots NGOs to national governments and businesses. 

She was EU Coordinator of the D-CENT project (Decentralised Citizens ENgagement Technologies). This involved building digital tools and platforms to help citizens engage in large scale democratic deliberation, integrating the collective intelligence of citizens in the political decision-making process, and included elements of deliberative democracy,  direct democracy and participatory budgeting. She was also  principal investigator of the DSI project on digital social innovation in Europe. 

Bria has been a member of the Internet of Things Council and an advisor for the European Commission on Future Internet and Smart Cities policy. She is also a member of the EC Expert Group on Open Innovation (OISPG) and a member of the European Research Cluster on the Internet of Things (IERC).

Bria advised the City of Rome and the Region of Lazio on innovation policy, open technology, and open cities. She has been teaching in several universities in the UK and Italy and she has advised Governments, public and private organizations on technology and innovation policy, and its socio-economic and environmental impact. She is also active in various organizations advocating for open access, digital rights, and  decentralized, privacy-aware technologies.

Bria's work with D-CENT brought her to the attention of Ada Colau, who in 2016 invited her to become the CTO of Barcelona. Bria moved from London to the Spanish city, where she remained until 2020. In January 2020 she was appointed president of Italy's newly created national innovation fund, a role she performs in parallel with lecturing and consulting on digital transformation, democracy and innovation to the United Nations and European Commission.  In 2021 she was elected by the Italian Parliament in the Management Board of RAI, the Italian public broadcast media.

Awards 
Francesca has been nominated Commander of the Order of Merit of the Italian Republic. She is also Culture Persons of the Year 2020 according to the newspaper Frankfurter Allgemeine Zeitung (FAZ). She has been listed in the top 50 Women in Tech by Forbes, and in the World's top 20 most influential people in digital government by Apolitical. She has also been featured in the Italian Magazine Repubblica "D", amongst the 100 Women Changing the World.

References 

People in information technology
Italian economists
Living people
Year of birth missing (living people)